Sergeant major general is a  now mostly extinct name of military rank. A prominent example was Philip Skippon in the English New Model Army as organized by Oliver Cromwell.

Over the course of the 17th century, the increasing professionalisation of armies saw sergeant major general become the most junior of the general ranks.  At the same time, the sergeant portion of the title was more and more commonly dropped; by the early 18th century, the rank's name had been permanently shortened to major general.

Since sergeant major general had ranked below lieutenant general, the newly named rank of major general appeared to create a precedence issue, in that a major outranks a lieutenant but a lieutenant general outranks a major general.  This continues to cause confusion to those unfamiliar with the history of the rank, particularly in those armies using insignia similar to the British Army. The rank is sometimes used by paramilitary organizations such as militias.

References

Military ranks